Anatoli Aleksandrovich Izmailov (19 August 1978 – 7 April 2011) was a Russian professional football player.

Club career
He played two seasons in the Russian Football National League for FC Vityaz Podolsk.

References

External links
 

1978 births
People from Podolsk
2011 deaths
Association football defenders
FC Vityaz Podolsk players
Russian footballers
Sportspeople from Moscow Oblast